WNDN (107.9 FM, "Wind FM") is a commercial radio station in Chiefland, Florida, broadcasting to the Gainesville-Ocala, Florida area on 107.9 FM. The same programming is simulcast on stations WYND-FM (Silver Springs) and WNDD (Alachua).

External links
Official Website

NDN
Classic rock radio stations in the United States
Radio stations established in 1991
1991 establishments in Florida